Puppy Love is a lost 1919 silent comedy film directed by Roy William Neill with Lila Lee in one of her first starring roles.

Cast
Josephine Crowell - Mercy Winters
Helen Dunbar - Mrs. Oliver
Emily Gerdes - Phyllis Winters
Harold Goodwin - James Gordon Oliver
Alice Knowland - Saraphina Winters
Lila Lee - Gloria O'Connell
Edna Murphy - 
Charles Murray - Shamus O'Connell
Lincoln Stedman - Hippo Harger

References

External links
Puppy Love at IMDb.com

lobby poster(archived)

1919 films
American silent feature films
Films directed by Roy William Neill
Lost American films
Paramount Pictures films
American black-and-white films
Silent American comedy films
1919 comedy films
1919 lost films
Lost comedy films
1910s American films